The Senior Tourist Trophy is a motorcycle road race that takes place during the Isle of Man TT festival, an annual event traditionally held over the last week in May and the first week in June. The Senior TT is the Blue Riband event of the festival that takes place on the Friday of race week, with "The Marquis de Mouzilly St. Mars trophy" awarded to the winner.

The event was part of the FIM Motorcycle Grand Prix World Championship from 1949 to 1976, before being transferred to the United Kingdom after safety concerns, becoming the British Grand Prix under the FIM from the 1977 GP season.

Until 2012, the Senior TT had never been cancelled except during the two World Wars and during travel restrictions associated with the animal foot and mouth outbreak in 2001. However, during the 2012 TT Races, with inclement weather on the day prior to its traditional Friday race day (8 June), the decision was taken to postpone racing until the following day, Saturday, 9 June. Consequently, a course inspection was made, and following a meeting between riders and officials, the decision was made to cancel the running of the Senior race for safety reasons. The races were cancelled in 2020 and 2021 due to the Covid-19 pandemic.

Engine capacity
The 1911 TT races was the first time the Senior TT race took place and was open to 500 cc single-cylinder and 585 cc twin-cylinder motorcycles. It was won by Oliver Godfrey riding an Indian, at an average speed of 47.63 mph over five laps of the Snaefell Mountain Course that was in use for the first time that year. The 1912 event was the first to limit the Senior TT to 500 cc machines and this engine capacity prevailed until 1984.

The engine capacity was modified from the traditional (up to) 500 cc for two-strokes and is now (up to) 1,000 cc for four-strokes, although 1,000 cc machines were permitted in 1985 and 1986, 1,300 cc in 1987, 1988 and 1989, and 750 cc in 1990–1998.

Eligibility

Entrants
 Entrants must be in possession of a valid National Entrants or FIM Sponsors Licence for Road Racing.

Machines
The 2012 specification for entries into the Senior TT race are defined as:

 Any machine complying with the following specifications:
 TT Superbike: (Machines complying with the 2012 FIM Superbike and Supersport Championships specifications)
 (Over 750cc up to 1000cc 4 cylinders 4-stroke)
 (Over 750cc up to 1000cc 3 cylinders 4-stroke)
 (Over 850cc up to 1200cc 2 cylinders 4-stroke)
Supersport Junior TT (without limitation of tyre choice)
 TT Superstock (without limitation of tyre choice)
 Other machines admitted at the discretion of the Organisers

Official qualification time
 115% of the time set by the third fastest qualifier in the class.

Speed and lap records
The lap record for the Senior TT class is 16 minutes and 42.778 seconds at an average speed of  set by Peter Hickman during the 2018 Senior TT Race. The race record is also held by Hickman in 1 hour, 43 minutes and 08.065 seconds; an average race speed of  achieved during the same six-lap race.

The longest race distance for a FIM Motorcycle Grand Prix World Championship event was the 500 cc 1957 TT race, over eight laps (302.00 Miles), won by Bob McIntyre riding a 500cc Gilera, in 3 hours, 2 minutes and 57.0 seconds at an average race speed of 98.99 mph.

List of Senior TT winners

Multiple winners (riders)

Multiple winners (manufacturers)

See also
TT Zero
Lightweight TT
Ultra-Lightweight TT
Sidecar TT
Junior TT
Superstock TT

References